Peter Peter may refer to:

Peter Peter (Canadian musician) (born 1984), Canadian singer-songwriter
Peter Peter (Danish musician) (born 1960), former member of the Danish rock band Sort Sol (formerly SODS)

See also
Peter Peter Pumpkin Eater